The 2021 Copa Verde was the 8th edition of the football competition held in Brazil. Featuring 24 clubs, Acre, Amazonas, Distrito Federal, Espírito Santo, Mato Grosso do Sul and Pará have two vacancies; Amapá, Goiás, Mato Grosso, Rondônia, Roraima and Tocantins with one each. The others six berths was set according to CBF ranking.

In the finals, Remo defeated Vila Nova 4–2 on penalties after tied 0–0 on aggregate to win their first title and a place in the third round of the 2022 Copa do Brasil.

Qualified teams

Schedule
The schedule of the competition is as follows.

First round

Draw

In the first round, each tie was played on a single-legged basis. The higher-ranked team hosted the match.  If the score was level, the match would go straight to the penalty shoot-out to determine the winner.

|}

Round of 16

In the round of 16, each tie was played on a single-legged basis. The higher-ranked team hosted the match.  If the score was level, the match would go straight to the penalty shoot-out to determine the winner.

|}

Bracket
From the quarter-finals, each tie was played on a home-and-away two-legged basis. If the aggregate score was level, the second-leg match would go straight to the penalty shoot-out to determine the winners.

Finals

Tied 0–0 on aggregate, Remo won on penalties.

References

Copa Verde
Copa Verde
Copa Verde